Balmoral is a suburb of Auckland, New Zealand that is bordered by Mount Eden, Epsom, Mount Roskill and Sandringham and is located approximately 5 km from the centre of Auckland. It was named around the turn of the 20th century and derives its name from Balmoral Castle, the Scottish country residence of the Royal family. Much of the housing in the area is from the 1920s and 1930s, often in the Californian Bungalow style. Balmoral was part of Mount Eden Borough Council which became a part of Auckland City in 1989. In November 2010, the area was included into the Albert-Eden-Roskill ward (now Albert-Eden-Puketāpapa ward) of the new Auckland Council.

A distinctive feature is the numerous Asian restaurants that are located in the Balmoral shopping area and the surrounding Dominion Road intersection.

Demographics

Balmoral had a population of 10,164 at the 2018 New Zealand census, an increase of 444 people (4.6%) since the 2013 census, and an increase of 777 people (8.3%) since the 2006 census. There were 3,276 households, comprising 5,058 males and 5,112 females, giving a sex ratio of 0.99 males per female, with 1,884 people (18.5%) aged under 15 years, 2,649 (26.1%) aged 15 to 29, 4,740 (46.6%) aged 30 to 64, and 897 (8.8%) aged 65 or older.

Ethnicities were 66.9% European/Pākehā, 5.2% Māori, 4.5% Pacific peoples, 28.7% Asian, and 3.5% other ethnicities. People may identify with more than one ethnicity.

The percentage of people born overseas was 37.8, compared with 27.1% nationally.

Although some people chose not to answer the census's question about religious affiliation, 56.8% had no religion, 28.0% were Christian, 0.1% had Māori religious beliefs, 4.4% were Hindu, 1.5% were Muslim, 2.1% were Buddhist and 2.8% had other religions.

Of those at least 15 years old, 3,828 (46.2%) people had a bachelor's or higher degree, and 546 (6.6%) people had no formal qualifications. 2,418 people (29.2%) earned over $70,000 compared to 17.2% nationally. The employment status of those at least 15 was that 4,716 (57.0%) people were employed full-time, 1,314 (15.9%) were part-time, and 276 (3.3%) were unemployed.

Notable buildings

 Methodist Church - Dominion Road. Red Brick Gothic church built in 1915 to the designs of Arthur White.
 Symphonia Hall - Cnr Dominion Road and St Albans Avenue. Former Cinema now used as the headquarter of the Auckland Philamonia Orchestra.
 Mont-le-Grand Flats - Cnr Dominion and Mont le Grand Roads. A 1930s block of flats. Concrete construction with marsailles tile roof & metal Critical windows.
 St Albans Church. 443 Dominion Road. Anglican Church - part of a worldwide association of congregations associated with St Alban - one of the first Christian martyrs in Britain. The wooden portion of this structure was built in 1884, the brick portion was added in 1905. Several congregations worship here to help make up the twelve acts of public worship that occur throughout every week. These include Hindi speaking Anglicans in Tikanga Pasifika whose Parish is called Anugrah (Grace), also the Eritrean Orthodox originating from North Africa.
 Russian Orthodox Church of the Resurrection (ROCOR) 447A Dominion Rd, Mt Eden, Auckland, New Zealand. Small wooden structure distinguished by the onion dome typical of old Russian architecture.
 The Mount Eden War Memorial Hall - 489 Dominion Road. 1957 modernist building in cream brick. In December 2010, Auckland Theatre Company moved into the lower ground floor of the Hall, refitting it to include their offices and two rehearsal spaces.
 Potter's Park - corner of  Dominion and Balmoral Roads. Named after Frederick Potter, one of Balmoral's Victorian landowners who gifted a piece of land for the community.
 The Christmas Tree House - 112 Balmoral Road. 19th century wooden house standing on a very large flat open property surrounded by scoria rock walls. This land is used to grow Xmas trees creating a slightly surreal effect of a white Victorian house in a perpetually unchanging monochrome green landscape. The last remaining example of the open 'empty' landscape which existed here before the 20th century suburban development swamped the area.
 Paddington Square - 149 - 157  Balmoral Road. 1970s development of town Houses on the site of an Edwardian Factory complex.
 The Capitol Picture Theatre - 614 Dominion Road. A 1920s cinema built in the neo-Greek style. During the 1980s it was one of Auckland's most popular art film venues, known as "Charlie Greys". In the late 1990s it was reduced in size and a portion of the auditorium became an indoor climbing venue. The rest of the building still operates as a cinema, and after years of screening mainly Indian films, it has been refurbished and is called the Capitol Cinema again.
 Balmoral Baptist Church. 682 Dominion Road. Cnr Dominion and Queens Road. 1960s modernist building in concrete and red brick.
 Brazier Bookshop. 714 Dominion Road. Bookshop run by the parents of Graham Brazier-New Zealand musician 
 Church of the Nazarene. 675 Dominion Road. Cnr Dominion Road and Telford Avenue.
 Cheapside - 727 and 771 Dominion Road. A pair of 1920s block of shops in the Spanish Mission style.

Education
Balmoral School is a full primary school catering for years 1–8. It has  students. It started as Brixton School in 1926.

It was founded in 1912.

Good Shepherd School is a state-integrated Catholic contributing primary school for years 1–6, with  students. It opened in 1912.

Balmoral Seventh-day Adventist School is a state-integrated full primary school for years 1–8 run by the Seventh-dayAdventist church. It was established in 1950 from the amalgamation of three earlier SDA schools.

All these schools are coeducational. Rolls are as of 

The local secondary schools are Mount Albert Grammar School, Marist College, Auckland Grammar School and St Peter's College.

References

External links
 Photographs of Balmoral held in Auckland Libraries' heritage collections.

Suburbs of Auckland